Imanol Elías Ayllón (born 17 August 1990), is a Spanish footballer who plays as a goalkeeper for UD Poblense.

Football career
Born in Pamplona, Navarre, Imanol finished his graduation with CA Osasuna's youth setup, and made his senior debuts with the reserves in the 2009–10 campaign, in Segunda División B. On 5 January 2013 he was named in the substitutes' bench with the main squad for the match against Sevilla FC, but remained unused in the La Liga 0–1 away loss.

In August 2013 Imanol rescinded his link with Osasuna, and moved to Zamora CF also in the third division. After appearing regularly with the latter he joined Segunda División's CD Mirandés on 3 July of the following year.

On 7 September 2014 Imanol appeared in his first game as a professional, starting in a 1–2 home loss against AD Alcorcón.

References

External links

1990 births
Living people
Footballers from Pamplona
Spanish footballers
Association football goalkeepers
Segunda División players
Segunda División B players
Tercera División players
CA Osasuna B players
Zamora CF footballers
CD Mirandés footballers
UP Langreo footballers
Haro Deportivo players